The Principality of Sedan (French: Principauté de Sedan) was an independent Protestant state centered on the Château de Sedan (now the city of Sedan) in the Ardennes. It was ruled by the Prince of Sedan (prince de Sedan), who belonged to the noble La Marck and La Tour d'Auvergne families. The Princes of Sedan asserted and acquired recognition of their sovereignty gradually between the 1520s and 1580s by means of adopting the princely title, minting coin, legislating and signing treaties. In 1641, during the Thirty Years' War, the Prince submitted to France and his principality was occupied the following year. In 1651 the reduced principality was exchanged for other lands in France and was annexed to the crown.

Geography
The following villages were located in the Principality of Sedan: Illy, Givonne, Douzy, Pouru-Saint-Remy, Rubécourt-et-Lamécourt, Balan, Fleigneux, Bazeilles, La Chapelle, La Moncelle, Villers-Cernay, Raucourt-et-Flaba, Noyers-Pont-Maugis, Wadelincourt, Haraucourt, Thelonne, Bulson, and Angecourt.

History

The history of Sedan begins in 1424, when Eberhard II von der Mark (1364–1440) (son of Eberhard I von der Mark and grandson of Engelbert II of the Mark, ruler of the County of Mark) began construction of the Château de Sedan in the vicinity of the Benedictine Abbey of Mouzon.  Erard II von der Mark was the first ruler to style himself Lord of Sedan (Fr.: seigneur de Sedan).  In the following years, the town of Sedan grew up in the area between the Château de Sedan and the Meuse.

In the wake of the Protestant Reformation, Henri-Robert de la Marck and his wife Françoise de Bourbon-Vendôme were attracted to the Huguenot movement.  In 1560, they declared Sedan's independence from the Kingdom of France.  Particularly in the wake of the 1562 Massacre of Vassy, Sedan became one of the leading refuges for French speaking Protestants.  The Academy of Sedan, founded in 1579, became one of the chief Huguenot academies.

With the death of Guillaume Robert de la Marck in 1588, the principality passed to his daughter, Charlotte de La Marck.  In 1591, she married Henri de La Tour d'Auvergne, who thereupon assumed her titles, becoming Prince of Sedan and Duke of Bouillon.  As such, the principality passed from the House of La Marck to the House of La Tour d'Auvergne.  Charlotte died childless in 1594, and the principality was ultimately inherited by Henri de La Tour d'Auvergne's son by his second marriage.

Henri de La Tour d'Auvergne was accused of participating in the 1602 plot to assassinate Henry IV of France led by Charles de Gontaut, duc de Biron and the 1604 intrigues involving Henry IV's former mistress, Catherine Henriette de Balzac d'Entragues.  In 1604, Henry IV declared Henri de La Tour d'Auvergne's lands forfeit to the crown of France and led an expedition to Sedan in 1606.  He also participated in a 1613 noble revolt against the king.  Henri de La Tour d'Auvergne's son, Frédéric Maurice de La Tour d'Auvergne, shared his father's antipathy to royal power.  In 1630, he participated in a revolt led by Gaston, Duke of Orléans.

Sedan finally lost its independence during the Thirty Years' War.  In spite of a victory over French royal forces at the Battle of La Marfée, held 6 July 1641, it soon became obvious that Sedan could no longer resist the forces of Louis XIII of France.  In 1642, Frédéric Maurice de La Tour d'Auvergne participated in the failed conspiracy led by Henri Coiffier de Ruzé, Marquis of Cinq-Mars; in the wake of Cinq-Mars' execution, Frédéric Maurice de La Tour d'Auvergne struck a deal with Louis XIII, who agreed to spare his life and give him a commission in the French army in Italy in exchange for the relinquishment of Sedan's sovereignty.  Sedan was thus annexed to the French crown in 1642.  Frédéric Maurice de La Tour d'Auvergne's younger brother, Henri de la Tour d'Auvergne, Vicomte de Turenne would go on to achieve fame as France's leading general.  In 1709, at the request of Lord Chancellor of France Henri François d'Aguesseau, the Parlement of Paris passed a decree reaffirming the French crown's sovereignty over Sedan.

List of rulers

Lords of Sedan, 1424–1560

Princes of Sedan, 1560–1642

Religious leaders

Protestant pastors

 Guido de Bres, 1562
 Pierre Du Moulin, 1621–58
 Pierre Jurieu, 1675–81

The Princes of Sedan founded the Academy of Sedan for the training of Protestant pastors.

Protestant refugees

 Nicasius le Febure
 Philippe de Mornay
 Anne d'Alègre and her son Guy XX de Laval
 Elisabeth de Hauteville, wife of Odet de Coligny
 the daughters of Maximilien de Béthune, Duke of Sully
 Jean Errard
 Pierre Pithou
 Louis, Count of Soissons
 Frederick V, Elector Palatine

Famous burials in the Protestant church

The Protestant Princes of Sedan were buried in the Protestant church in Sedan.  Burials in the church include:

 Henri de La Tour d'Auvergne (1623)
 Louis Hanau (1627) son of Countess Catharina Belgica of Nassau
 Julienne Catherine de la Tour d'Auvergne (1637)
 Countess Elisabeth of Nassau (1642)
 John Philip Frederick of the Palatinate (1650), son of Frederick V, Elector Palatine
 Henri de Roye de La Rochefoucauld (1656), vidame of Laon, son of Julienne Catherine de la Tour d'Auvergne
 Guy de Roye de La Rochefoucauld (1684), vidame of Laon, younger son of Julienne Catherine de la Tour

Other famous residents

 Bernard Palissy, famous potter

Notes

Former countries in Europe
Geography of Ardennes (department)
History of Grand Est
History of Ardennes (department)
States and territories established in 1560
States and territories disestablished in the 1650s
Sedan, Ardennes